Cory Williams (born August 9, 1993) is an American cyclist, who currently rides for UCI Continental team . He helped to establish the team in 2019 alongside his brother Justin Williams with the goal of increasing diversity and inclusion in cycling. A sprinter, Williams specializes in one-day and criterium races.

Major results

2014
 1st Barrio Logan Grand Prix
 1st Torrance Criterium
 1st Barry Wolfe Grand Prix
2015
 1st Stage 3 San Dimas Stage Race
 3rd Overall Tour of Murrieta
1st Stages 2 & 3
2016
 1st Roger Millikan Memorial Criterium
2017
 1st 
 1st Stage 2 Tour of Murrieta
 1st Carlos Soto Memorial Criterium
 1st Ontario Mid Season Criterium
2018
 1st Crystal Cup
 1st Stage 4 Sea Otter Classic
 1st Ontario Icebreaker Grand Prix
 1st Roger Millikan Memorial Criterium
 1st Ontario Season End Criterium
 3rd 
2019
 1st 
 1st Brackett Grand Prix
 1st Ontario End of Season Criterium
 1st Stage 3 Valley of the Sun Stage Race
 2nd Overall Tour of Murrieta
2020
 1st Overall Tour of Murrieta
1st Stage 1
 1st Stage 3 Valley of the Sun Stage Race
 1st Santa Barbara County Road Race
2021
 1st Overall Tulsa Tough
1st Stage 2

References

External links

1993 births
Living people
American male cyclists
Cyclists from Los Angeles